Qaleh-ye Gabri (also Romanized as Qal`eh-ye Gabrī; also known as Qalehgabra) is a village in Halil Rural District, in the Central District of Jiroft County, Kerman Province, Iran. At the 2006 census, its population was 85, in 20 families.

References 

Populated places in Jiroft County